The Thoroughbred Corporation is a Thoroughbred horse racing and breeding operation established in 1994 by principal partner Prince Ahmed bin Salman of the Saudi Arabian royal family. It was based at an  facility at Bradbury Estates, in Bradbury, California.

Educated at the University of California, Irvine, Prince Ahmed and college friend Richard Mulhall teamed up to go into Thoroughbred flat racing. Initially, Mulhall served as horse trainer but eventually became manager of racing operations. The Prince invested millions of dollars and succeeded in building a quality stable that was an important part of American and European racing.

The Thoroughbred Corp. won four American Classic Races, four Breeders' Cups, and is one of only four owners to have ever raced both a Kentucky Derby winner and an Epsom Derby winner. The others are John W. Galbreath, Michael Tabor, and Paul Mellon.

Some of the notable horses raced by The Thoroughbred Corp. include:

Based in the United States:
 Jewel Princess - (in partnership with Richard and Martha Stephen),  won the 1996 Breeders' Cup Distaff and was voted Eclipse Award for Outstanding Older Female Horse
 Sharp Cat - won 7 Grade 1 races in 1996,1997, and 1998
 Anees - won the 1999 Breeders' Cup Juvenile;  voted the Eclipse Award for Outstanding 2-Year-Old Male Horse
 Spain - won the 2000 Breeders' Cup Distaff;  retired as the richest mare in North American racing history
 Point Given - won the 2001 Preakness and Belmont Stakes; voted United States Horse of the Year
 Johar - won the 2002 Hollywood Derby and the 2003 Breeders' Cup Turf
 War Emblem - won the 2002 Kentucky Derby and Preakness Stakes; voted the Eclipse Award for Outstanding 3-Year-Old Male Horse

Based in Europe:
 Dr Fong - in 1998 won the Prix Eugène Adam, St. James's Palace Stakes
Royal Anthem - won the 1998 Canadian International Stakes and 1999 Juddmonte International
 Oath - won the 1999 Epsom Derby
 Elusive City - won the 2002 Prix Morny, voted Champion 2-Year-Old in France

Prince Ahmed bin Salman died unexpectedly at age 43 of heart failure in Riyadh. Prince Faisal succeeded him as the head of The Thoroughbred Corp. In March 2004, the bulk of the operation's horses were dispersed at a southern California auction and the organization's activities suspended. In 2022, the family	of	late Prince	
Ahmed revived	The	Thoroughbred	Corp. with	six	fillies	in	training	with	John and	Thady	Gosden	and the	corporation’s colors	gradually	returning	to	the	racing	tracks in	the	United	Kingdom.

References

 Bloodhorse article Thoroughbred Corporation Donates To NTRA New York Heroes Fund
 Ahmed bin Salman's Obituary at Horse-Races
 3 March 2004 article at About, Inc., A part of The New York Times Company, titled Thoroughbred Corp. Dispersal Sale
 "john-and-thady-gosden-to-train-under-a-joint-license"

American racehorse owners and breeders
Owners of Epsom Derby winners
Owners of Kentucky Derby winners
Owners of Preakness Stakes winners